The Archdeacon of Clogher is a senior ecclesiastical officer within the Anglican Diocese of Clogher. The Archdeacon is responsible for the disciplinary supervision of the clergy within the diocese. The archdeaconry can trace its history back to Reginald MacGilla Finin who held the office in 1268. The current incumbent is Brian John Harper.

Notable incumbents
Robert Heavener
James Heygate
James MacManaway
Thomas Parnell
John Russell
Charles Stack

References

 
Lists of Anglican archdeacons in Ireland
 
Religion in Northern Ireland